A list of protected aircraft monuments in France has national aviation heritage protected sites, known as monument historique.

History
The list of registered monuments is made by the Ministry of Culture.

Aircraft protected monuments
 Nantes, Nantes Atlantique Airport (Aéroport de Nantes-Atlantique), Lockheed L-1049 Super Constellation, registered on 10 December 2004

See also
 Aviation in France

References

External links
 Ministère de la Culture

Aircraft preservation
Aviation history of France
Heritage registers in France
Aircraft
Monuments historiques of France